Theodor Wertheim  (25 December 1820 – 6 July 1864) was an Austrian chemist born in Vienna. He was the father of gynecologist Ernst Wertheim (1864-1920).

He studied organic chemistry in Berlin as a pupil of Eilhard Mitscherlich, and in 1843 travelled to the University of Prague, where he studied under Josef Redtenbacher. He served as privatdozent in Vienna, and from 1853 to 1860, was a professor at the University of Pest. From 1861 onward, he was a professor at the University of Graz. In May 1864, he moved back to Vienna, where he died soon afterwards.

In 1848 he became a corresponding member of the Vienna Academy of Sciences.

In 1844 Wertheim distilled a pungent substance from garlic, naming it "allyl". In his research, he noticed the close relationship between garlic oil and mustard oil. He published a number of studies on garlic oil, piperine, quinine and coniine in Liebig’s Annalen der Chemie.

See also
Allyl group
Diallyl disulfide

References 

 
  biography @ Allgemeine Deutsche Biographie

Bibliography 

 Johannes Uray, Organische Chemie in chemischer Forschung und Lehre an österreichischen Universitäten zwischen 1840 und 1870. In: Bericht über den 25. Österreichischen Historikertag in St. Pölten 2008. St. Pölten 2010, S 402-427.

19th-century Austrian people
Austrian chemists
Academic staff of the University of Vienna
Academic staff of Eötvös Loránd University
Academic staff of the University of Graz
Scientists from Vienna
1820 births
1864 deaths